William Perry Clowers (August 14, 1898 – January 13, 1978) was a relief pitcher who played briefly for the Boston Red Sox during the 1926 season. Listed at 5' 11", 175 lb., Clowers batted and threw left-handed. He was born in San Marcos, Texas.

In two appearances, Clowers posted a 0.00 earned run average without a decision in 1 ⅔  innings pitched.

Clowers died in Sweeny, Texas at the age of 79.

See also
Boston Red Sox all-time roster

External links

Retrosheet

Boston Red Sox players
Major League Baseball pitchers
Baseball players from Texas
1898 births
1978 deaths
Sportspeople from San Marcos, Texas